Albert III ( 1027 – 22 June 1102) was the Count of Namur from 1063 until his death. He was the son of Count Albert II and Regelinde of Verdun.

Although he was not formally a duke, Albert is considered to have played the role of an acting Duke of Lower Lotharingia, or "vice duke", during part of his lifetime, while the king's young son Conrad was named as Duke. However he lost this position when Godfrey of Bouillon was given the duchy.

Biography

From 1071 to 1072, he helped Richilde, Countess of Hainaut and Flanders fight against Robert the Frisian, but the Countess was beaten and lost Flanders.

In 1076, supported by Matilda of Tuscany, he claimed the Duchy of Bouillon, claiming to have rights by his mother, and fought against Godfrey of Bouillon to assert his claims. During a battle near Dalhem, he killed Hermann II, Count Palatine of Lotharingia (20 September 1085), making him fall out of favor with the German emperor. Finally, with the Truce of God in 1086, the Bishop of Liège succeeded in making peace between the warring parties in favor of Godfrey.

In 1099, Otbert, Bishop of Liege gave him the county of Brunengeruz, territory which had been contested by the counts of Leuven, but the counts of Namur were not able to hold this territory in the long run.

Marriages and issue

In 1065 he married Ida (d. 1102), widow of Frederick of Luxembourg, Duke of Lower Lorraine, and daughter of Bernard II, Duke of Saxony. They had 5 children

 Godfrey I, Count of Namur (1068–1139)
 Henry, Count of La Roche (1070–1138)
 Frederick, Bishop of Liège (d. 1121)
 Albert, Count of Jaffa (d. 1122)
 Adelaide (1068–1124), married Otto II, Count of Chiny

Notes

References
 

Counts of Namur
House of Namur
1020s births
1102 deaths
Year of birth uncertain

11th-century people of the Holy Roman Empire
12th-century people of the Holy Roman Empire